The Cambridge IT Skills Diploma is a certificate that is based on the Microsoft Office software, this certificate assesses a range of the most important IT skills required and is available at two levels: Foundation and Standard.

Exam methodology 
These Online based examinations consist of two levels from which the candidate can choose. Standard and Foundation assessments are computer-based and available on-demand throughout the year to provide a high-quality and flexible assessment service for individuals and centers.

Diploma modules 
The program's modules cover the following topics:

 Introduction to IT.
 PC Usage and Managing files.
 Word Processing, Spreadsheets, Presentations and Databases using Microsoft Office.
 Electronic Communication using Microsoft Internet Explorer.

Diploma types 
The name of the certificate awarded to the successful candidate is the “Cambridge International Diploma in IT Skills”

There are four types of Diploma:
 Single-Module Diploma, the basic requirement for it is any of the seven applications.
 Four-Module Diploma, the basic requirements for it are Introduction to IT, Windows, Word and Electronic communication.
 Five-Module Diploma, the basic requirements for it are Windows, Word, Excel, (Access or PowerPoint) and Internet communication.
 Seven-Module Diploma, the basic requirements for it are Introduction to IT, Windows, Microsoft Office and Internet communication.

Recognition and accreditation 
Due to the importance of the Cambridge Diploma in IT Skills, many professional bodies and international organizations have given their support, ranging from official approval of the Diploma to requiring the Diploma for their employees.

The Cambridge Diploma in IT Skills is recognized by many organizations and governments such as Jordan, Kuwait, Kingdom of Bahrain, Lebanon, United Arab Emirates (UAE), United Nations Educational, Scientific and Cultural Organization (UNESCO) and United Nations Relief and Works Agency (UNRWA). 
Abu-Ghazaleh Cambridge IT SkillCenter is the exclusive center in the Middle East that provides the Cambridge IT Skills Diploma in Arabic.

References 
 CIE.org
 terabyteit.com
 ameinfo.com

External links 
 Cambridge International Diploma in Information Technology
 Abu-Ghazaleh Cambridge Information Technology Skills Center

Information technology qualifications
IT Skills Diploma